Piparea is a genus of flowering plants belonging to the family Salicaceae.

Its native range is Southern Mexico to Southern Tropical America.

Species:

Piparea dentata 
Piparea multiflora 
Piparea spruceana

References

Salicaceae
Salicaceae genera